The 78th Illinois Infantry Regiment was an infantry regiment that served in the Union Army during the American Civil War.

History 
The 78th Illinois Infantry Regiment Regiment was organized at Quincy, Illinois, in Adams County, mustering in on September 1, 1862.  The 78th Illinois then left the state by way of the steamboat along the Mississippi River for Louisville, Kentucky, arriving on September 19, 1862.  The 78th Illinois Infantry Regiment Regiment was organized at Quincy, Illinois, in Adams County.  The 78th Illinois Infantry Regiment, would see all of its wartime duty in the Western Theater of the American Civil War.

The 78th Illinois was originally attached to 39th Brigade, 12th Division, Army of the Ohio.  The regiment went through a series of reassignments; first in November 1862 to Gilbert's Command, District of Western Kentucky, Department of the Ohio.  While in Franklin, Tennessee, in February 1863 the regiment was assigned to the Army of Kentucky, Department of the Cumberland.   In June 1863, another reassignment assigned the 78th Illinois to the 2nd Brigade, 1st Division Reserve Corps, Army of the Cumberland.  The final reorganization would come in October 1863, assigning the regiment to the 2nd Brigade, 2nd Division, XIV Corps.

The regiment received the blue United States uniform, typical of the civil war.  Initially, the regiment was armed with .69 caliber rifled muskets, altered to use a percussion cap.  In 1863, the regiment saw more modern arms provisioned to the soldiers;  a mixture of the Enfield rifle and Springfield Rifle Muskets were carried.  In 1864, all troops were armed with the Springfield Rifle Muskets.

Timeline

Formation Period 
  September 1, 1862
  Regimental Muster in Quincy, Illinois
  September 19, 1862
  Moved by steamboat from Quincy, Illinois, down the Mississippi River, then up the Ohio River to Kentucky

Defense of Kentucky Railroads 
  October 5, 1862 through January 30, 1863
  Moved to Shephardstown, Kentucky and guard Louisville & Nashville Railroad; the main line trussel bridges running south from Shepardstown through Elizabethtown and a spur line between Bardstown Junction to New Haven.  The regimental headquarters was primarily set in New Haven.  The regiment was placed at several key bridges, splitting it apart having one to three companies guard each bridge.
  December 28, 1862
  Action at Muldraugh's Hill.  Companies B and C were positioned at one of these bridges on December 28, 1862.  General John Hunt Morgan’s cavalry fired artillery at the two companies, of which the Union companies had no artillery to return fire.  Consequently, the two companies surrendered to Morgan and were paroled.  They were first sent to the north at Louisville and then west to St. Louis, where they would be held at Benton Barracks until they could be exchanged.
  December 30, 1862
  Action against Company H at New Haven
  January 30 — February 7, 1863
  Moved to Nashville, Tennessee

Middle Tennessee Operations 
   February–April 1863

  February 3, 1863
  Repulse of Confederate General Nathan Bedford Forrest's attack on Fort Donelson, Tennessee
  February 12 through June 23, 1863
  Moved to Franklin, Tennessee
  March 4, April 10 and June 4–5, 1863
  Actions at Franklin

Tullahoma Campaign 

   June 24 and July 3, 1863

  June 24–28, 1863
  March to Triune, Murfreesboro and then to marching near Shelbyville
  July 1, 1863
  Occupation of Shelbyville and Middle Tennessee through August 1863

Chickamauga Campaign 

   August 16 to September 22, 1863

 September 19 – 20, 1863
 Battle of Chickamauga — On the final day of the battle, the 78th Illinois served a vital role as part of Mitchell's Brigade in reinforcing Thomas at the height of the Confederate attack and took 40% casualties

Chattanooga Campaign 

   September through November 1863
 September 24 — November 23, 1863
  Siege of Chattanooga, Tennessee
 November 23 — 24, 1863
 Tunnel Hill
 November 24 — 25, 1863
 Missionary Ridge — (Regiment temporarily attached to 15th Army Corps November 24)
 November. 26, 1863
 Chickamauga Station
 November 29 — December 17, 1863
 March to relief of Knoxville
 February 22 — 27, 1864
 Demonstration on Dalton, Georgia
 February 23 — 25, 1864
 Tunnel Hill, Buzzard's Roost Gap and Rocky Faced Ridge
 April 11 — 13, 1864
  Reconnaissance from Rossville to La Fayette

Atlanta Campaign 

   May 1 to September 8, 1864

  May 6 — 7, 1864
  Tunnel Hill
  May 8 — 11, 1864
  Battle of Rocky Face Ridge
  May 8 — 9, 1864
  Buzzard's Roost Gap
  May 9 — 13, 1864
  Demonstration on Dalton
  May 14 — 15, 1864
  Battle of Resaca
  May 17 — 18, 1864
  Rome
  May 19 — 25, 1864
  Battle of Dallas
  May 25 — May 26, 1864
  Battle of New Hope Church
  June 9 — July 3, 1864
  Battle of Marietta
  June 11 — 14, 1864
  Pine Mountain
  June 15 — 17, 1864
  Lost Mountain
  June 27, 1864
  Battle of Kennesaw Mountain — The regiment participated in an unsuccessful and costly assault on the Confederate position on Cheatham Hill.
  July 4, 1864
  Ruff's Station, Smyrna Camp Ground
  July 5 — 17, 1864
  Chattahoochee River
  July 19 — 20, 1864
  Battle of Peach Tree Creek
  July 22 — August 25
  Battle of Atlanta
  August 5 — 7, 1864
  Battle of Utoy Creek
  August 25 — 30, 1864
  Flank movement on Jonesboro
  August 31 — September 1, 1864
  Battle of Jonesboro — The 78th Illinois was in Baird's Division, which spearheaded the successful attack on the Confederate line
  September 2 — 6, 1864
  Lovejoy Station
Operations In North Georgia and North Alabama against Forest and Hood  (September 29 — November 3, 1864)
  October 6 — 8, 1864
  Florence

 Sherman's March to the Sea 

  November 15 to December 21, 1864  December 10 — 21, 1864  Siege of Savannah.

 Carolinas Campaign 

  January through April 1865  March 16, 1865  Battle of Averasborough — Taylor's Hole Creek, North Carolina
  March 19 – 21, 1865  Battle of Bentonville — Here, the regiment was nearly surrounded while assigned to picket duty
  March 24, 1865  Occupation of Goldsbore
  April 10 – 14, 1865  Advance on Raleigh
  April 14, 1865  Occupation of Raleigh
  April 26, 1865  Bennett Place — Surrender of Johnston and his army

 Post War Activities 
  April 29 — May 19, 1865  March to Washington, D.C. — via Richmond, Virginia
  May 24, 1865  Grand Review
  June 7, 1865  Mustered out

 Strength and Casualties 
When the regiment mustered in on September 1, 1862, it included 862 enlisted men.  The regiment suffered 9 officers and 95 enlisted men who were killed in action or mortally wounded and 117 enlisted men who died of disease, for a total of 221 fatalities.

 Regimental Organization 

 Headquarters 

The 78th Illinois Infantry Regiment Regiment was organized at Quincy, Illinois, in Adams County.Commanding Officers' 
Colonel William H. Bennison – resigned commission September 2, 1863.
Colonel Carter Van Vleck – died of wounds August 23, 1864.
Colonel Maris R. Vernon – Mustered out with the regiment.

 Company A 

Recruited in Schuyler County, Illinois.

 Company B 

Recruited in Adams County, Illinois.

Companies B and C were captured by, then Colonel, John Hunt Morgan during a December 26, 1862, raid at Muldraugh Hill.  They were sent to St. Louis, Missouri, under terms of parole and not exchanged until October 1863, effectively reducing the regiment by two companies of infantry.

 Company C 

Recruited in McDonough County, Illinois.

 Company D 

Recruited in Hancock County, Illinois.

 Company E 

Recruited in Adams County.

 Company F 

Recruited in Adams County.

 Company G 

Recruited in Adams County.

 Company H 

Recruited in Hancock County.

During the same raid that captured Companies B and C, Colonel Morgan attacked the Regimenal Headquarters and Company H, on the morning of December 30, 1862, in New Haven, Kentucky.  The company sustained no casualties, but it was assumed that Colonel Morgan's cavalry did, but was never substantiated.

 Company I 

Recruited in McDonough County.

 Company K 

Recruited in Adams County.

 Memorials 

There is a memorial to the soldiers of the 78th Illinois at the Chickamauga & Chattanooga National Military Park.

See also
List of Illinois Civil War Units
Illinois in the American Civil War

 Further reading 
 Robbins, Edward Mott Civil War experiences, 1862–1865: Chickamauga, Mission Ridge, Buzzard Roost, Resaca, Rome, New Hope Church, Kenesaw Mountain, Peach Tree Creek, Atlanta, Jonesboro, Averysboro, Bentonville'' Carthage, 1919.
 The Civil War Archive
 The War of the Rebellion: a Compilation of the Official Records of the Union and Confederate Armies

References

Notes 

Units and formations of the Union Army from Illinois
1862 establishments in Illinois
Military units and formations established in 1862
Military units and formations disestablished in 1865